Kouakou Hervé Koffi (born 16 October 1996) is a Burkinabe professional footballer who plays as a goalkeeper for Belgian club Charleroi and the Burkina Faso national team.

Club career
Koffi joined ASEC Mimosas of Abidjan in November 2015.

On 21 June 2017, Koffi joined Lille on a five-year deal. He made his debut for Lille in a 2–0 Ligue 1 loss to Caen on 20 August 2017.

In the 2019–20 season, Koffi moved to Belenenses SAD on loan, where he played 20 league games despite suffering some minor injuries. The following season, he joined Lille's partner club Mouscron on another loan, where he replaced Jean Butez who had left for Antwerp.

On 6 July 2021, Koffi joined Charleroi in Belgium on a three-year contract.

International career
In 2015, Koffi represented the Burkina Faso national team at the African Games football tournament. In 2017, he represented Burkina Faso in the Africa Cup of Nations. Koffi also featured in the 2021 AFCON tournament in Cameroon.

Personal life
He is the son of former Burkinabe international footballer Hyacinthe Koffi who played in the 2000 African Cup of Nations qualification campaign.

Honors
Burkina Faso
Africa Cup of Nations bronze: 2017

References

External links
 
 

1996 births
Living people
People from Bobo-Dioulasso
Burkinabé footballers
Association football goalkeepers
Burkina Faso international footballers
African Games silver medalists for Burkina Faso
African Games medalists in football
Competitors at the 2015 African Games
2021 Africa Cup of Nations players
ASF Bobo Dioulasso players
ASEC Mimosas players
Lille OSC players
Belenenses SAD players
Royal Excel Mouscron players
R. Charleroi S.C. players
Ligue 1 players
Primeira Liga players
Belgian Pro League players
Burkinabé expatriate footballers
Expatriate footballers in France
Burkinabé expatriate sportspeople in France
Expatriate footballers in Portugal
Burkinabé expatriate sportspeople in Portugal
Expatriate footballers in Belgium
Burkinabé expatriate sportspeople in Belgium
21st-century Burkinabé people